Pope Pius II, born Enea Silvio Bartolomeo Piccolomini (18 October 1405 – 14 August 1464), was head of the Catholic Church and ruler of the Papal States from 19 August 1458 to his death in August 1464. He was born at Corsignano in the Sienese territory of a noble but impoverished family.

He was a Renaissance humanist, famous as an author in Latin before he became pope.  His longest and most enduring work is the story of his life, the Commentaries, which is the only revealed autobiography ever to have been written by a reigning pope.  This was only published in 1584.

Early life
Aeneas was born to Silvio, a soldier and member of the House of Piccolomini, and Vittoria Forteguerri, who had 18 children including several twins, though most died at a young age. He worked with his father in the fields for some years and at age 18 left to study at the universities of Siena and Florence. He settled in the former city as a teacher, but in 1431 accepted the post of secretary to Domenico Capranica, bishop of Fermo, then on his way to the Council of Basel (1431–39). Capranica was protesting against the new Pope Eugene IV's refusal of a cardinalate for him, which had been designated by Pope Martin V. Arriving at Basel after enduring a stormy voyage to Genoa and then a trip across the Alps, he successively served Capranica, who ran short of money, and then other masters.

In 1435 he was sent by Cardinal Albergati, Eugenius IV's legate at the council, on a secret mission to Scotland, the object of which is variously related even by himself. He visited England as well as Scotland, underwent many perils and vicissitudes in both countries, and left an account of each. The journey to Scotland proved so tempestuous that Piccolomini swore that he would walk barefoot to the nearest shrine of Our Lady from their landing port. This proved to be Dunbar; the nearest shrine was  distant at Whitekirk. The journey through the ice and snow left Aeneas afflicted with pain in his legs for the rest of his life. Only when he arrived at Newcastle did he feel that he had returned to "a civilised part of the world and the inhabitable face of the Earth", Scotland and the far north of England being "wild, bare and never visited by the sun in winter". In Scotland, he fathered a child but it died.

Upon his return to Basel, Aeneas sided actively with the council in its conflict with the Pope, and although still a layman, eventually obtained a share in the direction of its affairs. He refused the offer of the diaconate, as he shrank from the ecclesiastical state because of the obligation of sexual continence which it imposed. Even the offer to become one of the electors of a successor to Eugene IV was not enough for him to overcome his reluctance. He supported the creation of the Antipope Felix V (Amadeus, Duke of Savoy) and participated in his coronation. Aeneas then was sent to Strasbourg where he fathered a child with a Breton woman called Elizabeth. The baby died 14 months later. Piccolomini served briefly as secretary to Felix, and in 1442 was sent as envoy to the Diet of Frankfurt. From there he went to the court of Holy Roman Emperor Frederick III in Vienna, who named him imperial poet, and offered him a position at court, where he obtained the patronage of the emperor's chancellor, Kaspar Schlick. Some identify the love adventure that Aeneas related in his romance The Tale of Two Lovers with an escapade of the chancellor.

Aeneas' character had hitherto been that of an easy and democratic-minded man of the world with no pretense to strictness in morals or consistency in politics. Being sent on a mission to Rome in 1445, with the ostensible object of inducing Pope Eugene to convoke a new council, he was absolved from ecclesiastical censures and returned to Germany under an engagement to assist the Pope. This he did most effectually by the diplomatic dexterity with which he smoothed away differences between the papal court of Rome and the German imperial electors. He played a leading role in concluding a compromise in 1447 by which the dying Pope Eugene accepted the reconciliation tendered by the German princes. As a result, the council and the antipope were left without support. He had already taken orders, and one of the first acts of Pope Eugene's successor, Pope Nicholas V (1447–1455), was to make him Bishop of Trieste. He later served as Bishop of Siena.

In 1450 Aeneas was sent as ambassador by the Emperor Frederick III to negotiate his marriage with Princess Eleonore of Portugal. In 1451 he undertook a mission to Bohemia and concluded a satisfactory arrangement with the Hussite leader George of Poděbrady. In 1452 he accompanied Frederick to Rome, where Frederick wedded Eleanor and was crowned emperor by the pope. In August 1455 Aeneas again arrived in Rome on an embassy to proffer the obedience of Germany to the new pope, Calixtus III. He brought strong recommendations from Frederick and Ladislaus V of Hungary (also King of Bohemia) for his nomination to the cardinalate, but delays arose from the Pope's resolution to promote his own nephews first, and he did not attain the object of his ambition until December of the following year. He did acquire temporarily the bishopric of Warmia (Ermeland).

Election to papacy

Calixtus III died on 6 August 1458. On 10 August, the cardinals entered into a papal conclave. According to Aeneas' account, the wealthy cardinal Guillaume d'Estouteville of Rouen, though a Frenchman and of apparently exceptionable character, seemed certain to be elected. In a passage of his own history of his times, long excerpted from that work and printed clandestinely in the Conclavi de' Pontifici Romani, Aeneas explained how he frustrated the ambitions of d'Estouteville. It seemed appropriate to Aeneas that the election should fall upon himself: although the sacred college included a few men of higher moral standards, he believed that his abilities made him most worthy of the papal tiara. It was the peculiar faculty of Aeneas to accommodate himself perfectly to whatever position he might be called upon to occupy, and he now believed that he could exploit this adaptability to assume the papacy with appropriate success and personal character. After a minimum of intrigue among the cardinals, he was able to secure enough votes for his candidacy after the second ballot to be elected unanimously. He was crowned Pope on 3 September 1458.

According to Michael de la Bédoyère, "The new Pope, Pius II, was expected to inaugurate an even more liberal and paganised era in the Vatican. He had led the dissipated life of a gentleman of the day and complained of the difficulty of practicing continency, a difficulty he did not surmount. But he had reformed and his reign was noted for his interest in the Crusade and his insistence that the doctrine holding General Councils of the Church to be superior to the Pope was heretical."

Papal policies and initiatives

After allying himself with Ferdinand, the Aragonese claimant to the throne of Naples, his next important act was to convene a congress of the representatives of Christian princes at Mantua for joint action against the Turks. On 26 September 1459 he called for a new crusade against the Ottomans and on 14 January 1460 he proclaimed the official crusade that was to last for three years. His long progress to the place of assembly resembled a triumphal procession, and the Council of Mantua of 1459, a complete failure as regards its ostensible object of mounting a crusade, at least showed that the impotence of Christendom was not owing to the Pope. The Pope, however, influenced Vlad III Dracula, whom he held in high regard, in starting a war against Sultan Mehmed II of Turkey. This conflict at its peak involved the Wallachians trying to assassinate the Sultan (see The Night Attack).

On his return from the congress, Pius II spent a considerable time in his native district of Siena, where he was joined by his erstwhile host in Mantua Ludovico Gonzaga. Pius described his delight with country life in very pleasing language. Passages such as those and others where he marvels at landscapes and other natural beauties, or stories about his dog Musetta, were to be expurged from the first edition of his Commentaries published in 1584 as embarrassingly unfitting, coming from the pen of a pope. He was recalled to Rome by the disturbances occasioned by Tiburzio di Maso, who was ultimately seized and executed. In the struggle for the Kingdom of Naples between the supporters of the House of Aragon and the House of Anjou, the Papal States were at this time troubled by rebellious barons and marauding condottieri, whom he gradually, though momentarily, quelled. The Neapolitan War was also concluded by the success of the Pope's ally the Aragonese Ferdinand. In particular, the Pope engaged for most of his reign in what looked like a personal war against Sigismondo Pandolfo Malatesta, Lord of Rimini, with the result of the almost complete submission of that condottiero. Pius II also tried mediation in the Thirteen Years' War of 1454–66 between Poland and the Teutonic Knights, but, when he failed to achieve success, cast an anathema over Polish and Prussians both. Pius II was also engaged in a series of disputes with King George of Bohemia and Archduke Sigismund of Austria (who was excommunicated for having arrested Nicholas of Cusa, Bishop of Brixen).

In July 1461, Pius II canonized Saint Catherine of Siena, and in October of the same year he gained what at first appeared to be a brilliant success by inducing the new king of France, Louis XI, to abolish the Pragmatic Sanction of Bourges, by which the papal authority in France had been grievously impaired. But Louis XI had expected that Pius II would in return espouse the French cause in Naples, and when he found himself disappointed he virtually re-established the Pragmatic Sanction by royal ordinances. Pius II built a fortress in Tivoli called Rocca Pia in 1461. In September 1462, he confirmed the Diocese of Ljubljana, established in December 1462 by Frederick III, Holy Roman Emperor.

The crusade for which the Congress of Mantua had been convoked made no progress. In November 1463, Pope Pius II tried to organize the crusade against the Ottomans, similar to what Nicholas V and Calixtus III had tried to do before him. Pius II invited all the Christian nobility to join, and the Venetians immediately answered the appeal. So did George Kastriot Skanderbeg the leader of Albanian resistance, who on 27 November 1463 declared war on the Ottomans and attacked their forces near Ohrid. Pius II's planned crusade envisioned assembling 20,000 soldiers in Taranto, and another 20,000 would be gathered by Skanderbeg. They would have been marshaled in Durazzo under Skanderbeg's leadership and would have formed the central front against the Ottomans. The Pope did his best: he addressed an eloquent letter to the Ottoman ruler, Mehmet II, urging him to become a Christian, a letter that probably never was sent. However, there are historians who believe that the mentioned letter was sent to the Sublime Porte. Not surprisingly, if it was delivered, the invitation was not successful. A public ceremony was staged to receive the relics of the head of Saint Andrew when it was brought from the East to Rome.

Pius II succeeded in reconciling the Emperor and the King of Hungary and derived great encouragement as well as pecuniary advantage from the discovery of mines of alum in the papal territory at Tolfa. However, France was estranged; the Duke of Burgundy broke his positive promises; Milan was engrossed with the attempt to seize Genoa; Florence cynically advised the Pope to let the Turks and the Venetians wear each other out. Pius II was aware that he was nearing his end, and his malady probably prompted the feverish impatience with which on 18 June 1464 he assumed the cross and departed for Ancona to conduct the crusade in person.

Slavery
Pius condemned slavery of newly baptized Christians as a "great crime" in an address of 1462 to the local ruler of the Canary Islands. Pius instructed bishops to impose penalties on transgressors. Pius did not condemn the concept of trading in slaves, only the enslavement of those who were recently baptised, who represented a very small minority of those captured and taken to Portugal. Pope Urban VIII, in his bull dated 22 April 1639, described these grave warnings of Pius (7 October 1462, Apud Raynaldum in Annalibus Ecclesiasticis ad ann n. 42) as relating to "neophytes". According to British diplomatic papers, the letter was addressed to Bishop Rubeira and confirms Urban's observation that the condemnation relates to new converts being enslaved.

Illness and death
In spite of suffering from a fever, Pope Pius II left Rome for Ancona in the hope of increasing the morale of the crusading army. However, the crusading army melted away at Ancona for want of transport, and when at last the Venetian fleet arrived, the dying Pope could only view it from a window. He died two days later, on 14 August 1464, and was succeeded by Pope Paul II. Pius II's body was interred at the Vatican, in Old St. Peter's Basilica, in the Chapel of S. Andrew. When his nephew, Pius III, died, his body was buried, at his own order in his Will, next to the body of Pius II in the Chapel of S. Andrew in S. Peter's. Demolition of Old St. Peter's began, on orders of Julius II, in 1506, and the tombs were moved to the crypt (grottoes) of S. Peter's. In 1612, when S. Andrea della Valle was completed, the bodies of the two popes, and part of their funeral monuments, were moved there, and re-entombed on 1 February 1613.

Reputation and legacy

Pius II was one of the most prominent authors of his period. His most important and longest work is his autobiography Commentaries in 12 and/or 13 books, first published in 1584 in Rome by Archbishop Francesco Bandini Piccolomini, a distant relative. Piccolomini altered it to some extent, removing words, phrases and whole passages that were unflattering to his relative. Bandini Piccolomini published it under the name of the scribe Iohannes Gobellinus, the scribe of the archetype edition from 1464, who was then misattributed as the author. This was a mistake because Pius II chose to write Commentaries from the third-person perspective, following Caesar's model.

Pius II was greatly admired as a poet by his contemporaries, but his reputation in belles lettres rests principally upon his The Tale of Two Lovers, which continues to be read, partly from its truth to nature, and partly from the singularity of an erotic novel being written by a future pope. He also composed some comedies, one of which (titled Chrysis) alone is extant. All of these works are in Latin. Pius II was the author of numerous erotic poems. However, such scandalous material was written before his election and a deep personal change.

His Epistles, which were collected by himself, are also an important source of historical information. The most valuable of his minor historical writings are his histories of Bohemia and of the Emperor Frederick III. He sketched biographical treatises on Europe and Asia, and in early and middle life produced numerous tracts on the political and theological controversies of his day, as well as on ethical subjects. The pontiff even wrote an exhaustive refutation of Islam.

His Epistles contain one of the best known descriptions of the enthronement ceremony of the Carinthian dukes on the Prince's Stone and the Duke's Chair. It is generally considered to be the source for Jean Bodin's description of the ceremony in his 
Six Livres de la République.

Pius was not an eminent scholar. His Latin was fluent, but he knew little Greek.

Pope Pius II inaugurated an unusual urban project, perhaps the first city planning exercise in modern Europe. He refurbished his home town of Corsignano (province of Siena, Tuscany) and renamed it Pienza, after himself. A cathedral and palaces were built in the best style of the day to decorate the city. They survive to this day. He also released a papal bull, Cum almam nostram urbem, prohibiting damage to ancient ruins in Rome or Campagna. In 1551, Henricus Petrus published the first edition of his collected works in Basel.

See also
 Cardinals created by Pius II
 Gregory of Heimburg, secretary to Pius II
 Pope Pius III, nephew of Pius II
 Bishops of Warmia
 Pienza

References

Bibliography
 Text from the 9th edition (1885) of the Encyclopædia Britannica. Original article author was Richard Garnett, LLD.
 Aeneas Silvius Piccolomini, Europe (c. 1400–1458). Ed. Nancy Bisaha. Trans. Robert Brown. Washington, DC: Catholic University of America Press, 2013. 
 .
 
 .
 .
 "The Historical Encyclopedia of World slavery", Editor Junius P. Rodriguez, ABC-CLIO, 1997, 
 "Black Africans in Renaissance Europe", Thomas Foster Earle, K. J. P. Lowe, Cambridge University Press, 2005, 
 "The Catholic Tradition of the Law of Nations", John Eppstein, The Lawbook Exchange, 2008, 
 {{cite book|title=British and Foreign State Papers", Foreign and Commonwealth Office, H.M.S.O.|year= 1857 |url=https://books.google.com/books?id=BNsMAQAAIAAJ}}
 John Julius Norwich, Absolute Monarchs: A History of the Papacy, Random House, 2011, 
 Charles A. Coulombe, Vicars of Christ: A History of the Popes, Citadel Press, 2003, 
 

External links

 Tomb of Pius II
 
 
 Stefan Bauer, Enea Silvio Piccolomini, in Il contributo italiano alla storia del pensiero: storia e politica'', ed. Giuseppe Galasso et al. (Rome: Istituto della Enciclopedia Italiana, 2013) (Ottava appendice della Enciclopedia italiana di scienze, lettere ed arti), pp. 137–43.

 
 

1405 births
1464 deaths
People from Pienza
Italian popes
Bishops of Warmia
Diplomats of the Holy See
House of Piccolomini
Italian male writers
15th-century Italian writers
15th-century Italian Roman Catholic bishops
15th-century Latin writers
Italian Renaissance humanists
Burials at Sant'Andrea della Valle
Renaissance Papacy
Christian humanists
Popes
15th-century popes
Bishops of Siena